Calvão may refer to:
 Calvão (Vagos), in Vagos Municipality, Portugal
 Calvão (Chaves), in Chaves Municipality, Portugal